Michael Fitzpatrick (1893 – 8 October 1968) was an Irish republican, Chief of Staff of the Irish Republican Army (IRA) and Clann na Poblachta politician.

Biography 
Born in Kilkenny in 1893, Fitzpatrick lived in Dublin and was described as "a man with the common touch and a good organizer." He was one of the 'driving forces' behind the anti-Treaty IRA in Dublin during the Irish Civil War. He was briefly the Officer commanding of the IRA's Dublin Brigade and was interned in 1923.

Fitzpatrick was a full-time official of the Grocers' trade union and secretary of its social club at the Banba Hall in Dublin's Parnell Square. He also managed the Balalaika Ballroom and restaurant in the same area.

IRA leadership
He was the central figure in IRA contacts with the Soviet Union during the late 1920s and in 1927, he represented the IRA Army Council at the first International Congress of the Friends of Soviet Russia (FOSR) in Moscow where he was elected to the presidium of the FOSR. In 1928 he helped establish an Irish section of the FOSR. During 1929 he was involved in launching the Irish Labour Defence League and the Workers' Revolutionary Party of Ireland. He was also involved in Comhairle na Poblachta, a body set up the same year to heal the rift between the military and political anti-Treaty forces in Ireland. In 1931 Fitzpatrick was elected to the National Executive board of Saor Éire - a far-left political organisation established in September 1931 by communist-leaning members of the IRA.  He visited the Soviet Union again in 1932.

Fitzpatrick chaired the 1933 IRA General Army Convention (GAC). At the 1934 GAC he disagreed with the call for a Republican Congress and remained within the IRA. His union was involved in a strike with O'Mara's Bacon Shops in late 1934 in which the IRA intervened violently. During 1935 he was involved in the IRA's intervention in the Dublin transport strike.

In 1936 he was appointed as the IRA Quartermaster General and was the unsuccessful candidate for Cumann Poblachta na hÉireann, a political party set up by the IRA. Fitzpatrick succeeded Tom Barry as Chief of Staff in 1937, only to be ousted by Seán Russell at the 1938 GAC.

He was involved in the 1946 launch of Clann na Poblachta - a political party which drew support from people who were tired of the old Civil War politics and wanted more concern for social issues. Fitzpatrick was a member of its national executive. At the 1948 general election, he was elected as a TD for Dublin North-West, winning 2,395 votes (10.3%). At the 1951 general election, he received 458 votes (1.9%) and lost his seat.

Mick Fitzpatrick died in 1969 and is buried in Glasnevin Cemetery, Dublin.

References

Further reading
Brian Hanley, The IRA. 1926–1936, Dublin (Four Courts Press), 2002. 

1893 births
1968 deaths
Irish Republican Army (1922–1969) members
Irish communists
People of the Irish Civil War (Anti-Treaty side)
Irish republicans interned without trial
Clann na Poblachta TDs
Members of the 13th Dáil
Politicians from County Wexford